Live Volume is a live album by American heavy metal band Corrosion of Conformity, released on August 7, 2001. It was recorded on April 20, 2001, at the Harpos Concert Theatre in Detroit, Michigan.

Track listing
These Shrouded Temples (instrumental) – 4:34
Diablo Blvd. - 3:53
Señor Limpio – 4:53
King of the Rotten – 3:19
Wiseblood – 3:38
Who's Got the Fire – 3:45
Albatross – 5:59
My Grain – 6:40
Congratulations Song – 3:43
13 Angels/7 Days – 8:11
Vote with a Bullet – 3:46
Zippo – 4:54
Long Whip/Big America – 5:32
Shelter – 5:33
Clean My Wounds – 8:41

Credits
Pepper Keenan – vocals, rhythm guitar
Woody Weatherman – lead guitar, vocals
Mike Dean – bass, keyboards, vocals
Jimmy Bower – drums, percussion

References

Corrosion of Conformity albums
2001 live albums
Sanctuary Records live albums